Pavoclinus litorafontis, the Slinky klipfish, is a species of clinid found around False Bay, South Africa, in the southeastern Atlantic ocean.  It can reach a maximum length of  TL.  This species feeds primarily on amphipods in the genera Ischyrocerus and Laetmatophilus.

References

External links
 Photograph

litorafontis
Fish described in 1965